Cosumnes may refer to
Cosumnes River in northern California, United States
Cosumnes River Preserve near Sacramento, California
Cosumnes River AVA, an American Viticultural Area in Sacramento County and San Joaquin County
Cosumnes River College in Sacramento, California
Cosumnes River College (Sacramento RT) a light rail station in Sacramento, California
Cosumnes Oaks High School in Elk Grove, California
Rancho Cosumnes in Sacramento County, California